Tuzantán is a town and one of the 119 Municipalities of Chiapas, in southern Mexico.

As of 2010, the municipality had a total population of 28,137, up from 23,180 as of 2005. It covers an area of 64.6 km².

As of 2010, the town of Tuzantán had a population of 2,863. Other than the town of Tuzantán, the municipality had 152 localities, the largest of which (with 2010 populations in parentheses) were: Xochiltepec (2,563), classified as urban, and Primer Cantón (1,477), Estación Tuzantán (1,225), and Villa Hidalgo (1,089), classified as rural.

References

Municipalities of Chiapas